Michael R. Strobl (born c. 1966) is a retired U.S. Marine Corps officer from Stafford, Virginia.

Michael joined the service when he was 17 years old, as told in the movie Taking Chance (2009).

After serving in Operation Desert Storm in 1991, Strobl was assigned a desk-job at Marine Corps Base Quantico in Quantico, Virginia during Operation Iraqi Freedom. Feeling guilty that Marines he served with in the Gulf War were serving in Operation Iraqi Freedom while he was not, Strobl volunteered to escort the remains of a fallen Marine to his home in the United States.

Chance Phelps
Strobl escorted home PFC Chance Phelps, a Marine killed in the Iraq War on April 9, 2004 (Good Friday), outside Ar Ramadi, Iraq.

Strobl was working at a desk-job, but volunteered to escort PFC Phelps home.  He initially did this because the press release concerning the death of PFC Phelps had listed Clifton, Colorado as his hometown, a town near Strobl's hometown of Grand Junction. The final destination and resting place, however, of PFC Phelps would be Dubois, Wyoming, Phelps having only lived in Clifton for his senior year of high school.

During the trip, Strobl kept a diary of the experience and his feelings. After he concluded the mission, he wrote an essay entitled "A Marine's Journey Home" from the notes in the diary and shared it with Phelps's father John. The essay appeared in the San Francisco Chronicle on May 2, 2004 (with the approval of John Phelps), and then a longer version (of 5,375 words) appeared in the July issue of Marine Corps Gazette as "Taking Chance".

Strobl's 12-page narrative essay followed his journey with the remains of PFC Phelps from the military mortuary at Dover Air Force Base to Philadelphia, Minneapolis, Billings, Riverton, and Dubois.

Strobl's essay became the subject of an HBO film, Taking Chance, in 2009. He helped write the screenplay, and he was portrayed in the film by Kevin Bacon. Subsequently, he co-won the Writers Guild of America Award in Long Form Adaptation in Television at the Writers Guild of America Awards 2009 and was co-nominated for the Primetime Emmy Award for Outstanding Writing for a Miniseries, Movie, or a Dramatic Special, both with Ross Katz.

Decorations and awards

Strobl received the Vietnam Veterans of America President's Award for Excellence in the Arts at the organization's national convention in Louisville, Kentucky in August 2009.

See also

 List of notable United States Marines

References

External links
 Essay: "A Marine's Journey Home". - San Francisco Chronicle. - May 2, 2004.

United States Marine Corps officers
American military writers
1966 births
Living people
Writers Guild of America Award winners
People from Grand Junction, Colorado
People from Stafford, Virginia
Military personnel from Colorado